Janet Schaw, traveller and diarist, was born between 1730 and 1740 in Lauriston Edinburgh. The third cousin, once removed of Sir Walter Scott, she was born into an old Scottish family. Little is known about her early life, but during her travels to the Antigua, St. Christopher, North Carolina, and Portugal in 1774–1776, she kept a journal, "blessedly unaware that as she jotted down her opinions and descriptions that she was a writing for posterity a document of rare interest and importance, now which as far as we know, and especially as it bears on the Scottish phase of American colonial history, is unique". After her return to Britain she lived in Edinburgh and Plymouth, where she met King George III and Queen Charlotte. Janet died in 1800.

Early life 
Little is known of Janet's early life, since the place and date of her birth are unclear, although she probably spent many years at Lauriston Yards, a fourteen-acre farm just outside Edinburgh, and had at least two brothers. The elder brother, Robert, was lost to Janet from childhood when he travelled at a young age to the American colonies, and the younger, Alexander (known as Sandie), accompanied her on her eventual voyage to those colonies. Their parents, Gideon Schaw of Lauriston, the Register of Tobacco in Edinburgh, and Anne Rutherfurd of Bowland, married in Edinburgh in 1723. However, upon Gideon's death in 1772, his affairs were such that Alexander had to sell the Lauriston estate.

Janet would have lived in Edinburgh at the time of the Edinburgh Enlightenment. When the ship in which she was travelling to the West Indies broached at sea, she calmed one of the children, Fanny, by getting her to read the nearest book, which she later realised was Elements of Criticism by Lord Kames.

Travels to the West Indies and US 
In 1774–1776, she sailed from Burntisland in Fife board The Jamaica Packet to St. Kitts and Antigua, in the West Indies, then to North and South Carolina, returning to Edinburgh via Portugal in 1776. She kept a journal of her travels which was discovered in the British Library in 1904 and published as Journal of a Lady of Quality Being the Narrative of a Journey from Scotland to the West Indies, North Carolina and Portugal in the Years 1774 -1776. On her travels she would experience storms at sea off Fair Isle, compare the slave-laboured sugar plantations to the improving East Lothian farms, witness the onset of the American Revolution in Cape Fear, and its effects on her family and friends, and marvel at the Christmas pageantry and processions in Portugal.

On her journeys she was accompanied by her brother Alexander Schaw, three adolescents, Fanny  (18) John  (11) and William (Billie) Rutherfurd (9), as well as Mrs. Mary Miller, her abigail, and a manservant, Robert. The three youngsters were the children of John Rutherfurd of Bowland, Midlothian (the Edgerston branch of the Rutherfurds) who was a plantation owner and former Customs official living in Wilmington. The children were returning to their father. Alexander was due to take up an appointment as Customs Officer on St. Kitts. Janet also visited her other brother Robert at his plantation, Schawfield, located a few miles from Wilmington on the Cape Fear River.

The Rutherfurd children had recently inherited a plantation.

On her journey, Janet would meet prominent West Indian families and Scots.

The Effect of the American Revolution 
Janet had planned to remain in North Carolina with Fanny, but the American revolution frustrated these plans. Her brother would not take up his post in St. Kitts. Instead he went off 'quietly on board the Scorpion Man of War to Boston' and then to London, carrying despatches from Governor Josiah Martin of North Carolina to Lord Dartmouth informing him of the situation in North Carolina.  Janet returned to Edinburgh via Portugal with Fanny, John and Billie. The boys were sent to England to be educated under the care of Lord Townshend. Fanny married Archbald Menzies shortly after their arrival home in October 1776.

Later life 

Janet returned to Edinburgh, living in the New Town. Fanny's husband would die and on 30 April 1787 at St. Martins-in the Field, London, Fanny married Janet's brother, Alexander Schaw.

Alexander Schaw was appointed as Storekeeper at the Gun Wharf in the Royal Dockyards at Plymouth Dock. Janet lived with Alexander and Fanny in the Officer's barracks there.

In 1789 George III and Queen Charlotte visited the Royal Dockyards to review the Fleet and the Dockyards. On Monday 17 August, they visited the Dockyard where they were met 'by a great number of naval and military officers."  According to Mrs W.H. Nelson, a descendant of the Rutherfurds, the King and Queen, "had lunch with Mr. and Mrs. Alexander Schaw and Miss Janet Schaw. There was a good view of the shipping to be had from their balcony and when, after lunch, Queen Charlotte, went out to look at it, Miss Janet Schaw spread a very beautiful shawl over the balcony railing for the queen to lean on. Afterward this shawl was put away as a relic and eventually went to New Zealand with members of the Schaw family who settled there."

Janet wrote her will on 14 March 1792 describing herself as a spinster. She left all her assets in Scotland and England to her 'dear Brother Alexander Schaw Esquire now of His Majesty's Ordinance at Plymouth Dock.' She may have been worried about her health when she wrote her will as the Bath Chronicle and Weekly Gazette records a Mr and Miss Schaw arriving in Bath in its 29 March 1792 issue.

Prior to her death, Janet, Alexander and Fanny subscribed to a book, Alonzo and Cora, with other original poems, principally elegiac by Elizabeth Scot, a native of Edinburgh to which are added letters in verse by Blacklock and Burns. The book would not be published until after Janet's death in 1800.

Janet was buried on 21 December 21, 1800 in Eggbuckland, in Plymouth, Devon.

Journal of a Lady of Quality 
The Journal records Janet's travels during 1774 - 1776 in a series of letters. In her first letter of 9pm October 25, 1774 she says "I propose writing every day, but you must not expect a regular journal. I will not fail to write whatever can amuse myself and whether you find it entertaining or not, I know you will refuse it a reading. As every subject will be guided by my own immediate feelings my opinions and descriptions will depend on the health and humour of the moment in which I write; from which cause my sentiments will often appear to differ on the same subject.'

Identifying 'a Lady of Quality' 
The journal was first discovered in 1904 during a search for other material in the British Library, where it was catalogued as Egerton 2423. The manuscript had no name on it and it was "only after much following of clues and searching in the records of England, Scotland, Ireland, the West Indies and America [that] the editors [have] been able to trace the careers of those who play the leading parts in the story.' A further two copies of the manuscript have since been found. One, owned by the Antiguan historian, Mr. Vere Langford Oliver, contained a dedication to Alexander Schaw Esquire "the Brother, friend and fellow traveler of the Author, his truly affect. Jen. Schaw, St. Andrew's Square, March 10, 1778." This helped to identify the author. The third manuscript had been passed down through the Schaw family and was owned by Colonel Vetch, a descendant of Janet's grandfather. Vetch was able to provide further genealogical information which appeared as a family tree in the 1939 edition. The North Carolina Collection at the University of North Carolina at Chapel Hill holds a contemporary manuscript copy.

Reviews and Academic Comment on Journal of a Lady of Quality 
The journal has been reviewed in a number of academic books as it contains a personal account of Colonial America and Empire on the brink of the American Revolution.

'The journal is eminently readable, at times gripping, with a distinctive narrative voice' and 'is an especially instructive example of the way aesthetics lent itself to knitting together categories of social denomination.'

The journal is clearly 'a private document' and takes the form of a letter. But who it was written for is a point of conjecture. Janet's statement that "At whatever time we meet, I am certain we will meet with unabated regards' has led to conjecture that it was written to someone who was "much more like a lover left behind than a friend.'

'We should celebrate Schaw's ability to bring that world to life, her incisiveness in noting the rituals and drama and details of the societies she encountered, and her relating even those things that she could not 'see' so clearly from her vantage point.

References 

1800 deaths
Scottish travel writers
British women travel writers
18th-century Scottish writers
Scottish Enlightenment
Plymouth, Devon
1730 births